Rebecca Reimer is an American politician and a Republican member of the South Dakota House of Representatives representing District 26B. Reimer was appointed to her position in August 2018 by South Dakota governor Dennis Daugaard to fill the seat left by James Schaefer after he died in May 2018.

References

Place of birth missing (living people)
Living people
Republican Party members of the South Dakota House of Representatives
21st-century American politicians
Women state legislators in South Dakota
Year of birth missing (living people)
21st-century American women politicians